Li Tchoan King (born in China on 6 May 1904; died in Toulon on 19 August 1971) was a Chinese-born draughts player and former French national champion.

References 

French draughts players
Players of international draughts
Chinese emigrants to France
1904 births
1971 deaths